José Calvo (March 3, 1916 – May 16, 1980) was a Spanish film actor best known for his roles in western films and historical dramas.

He made around 150 appearances mostly in films between 1952 and his death in 1980. He entered film in 1952 and was prolific as an actor throughout the 1950s and 1960s. He made many appearances in crime dramas, often with a historical theme and appeared in a high number of western films.

In 1964 he starred as the innkeeper Silvanito in Sergio Leone's Spaghetti Western production A Fistful of Dollars as one of Clint Eastwood's few "amigos" in the town of San Miguel. He later appeared in westerns such as I Giorni dell'ira (1967) opposite Lee Van Cleef, Anda muchacho, spara! (1971) and Dust in the Sun (1973) etc.

However, after the Spaghetti Western era of the late 1960s, in the 1970s he returned to appearing in primarily Spanish films and in contrast to the roles which dominated much of his career did appear in several Spanish comedy films often with slapstick humor as that genre grew popular in Latin cinema during this period.

He died in Gran Canaria on May 16, 1980, aged 64.

Selected filmography

 Dulce nombre (1952)
 La forastera (1952)
 The Pelegrín System (1952) as Padre de Gelasio
 Babes in Bagdad (1952) (Spanish version)
 Concierto mágico (1953)
 La danza de los deseos (1954) as Padre de Candela
 Elena (1954)
 It Happened in Seville (1955) as Mayoral Manuel
 El indiano (1955) as Capataz
 La cruz de mayo (1955) as Fiscal
 El coyote (1955)
 Duelo de pasiones (1955)
 Un día perdido (1955) as Don Patricio
 El puente del diablo (1956) as Fiscal
 Ha pasado un hombre (1956) as García
 Uncle Hyacynth (1956) as Almacenista
 The Big Lie (1956) as Productor que habla con censor
 También hay cielo sobre el mar (1956)
 Todos somos necesarios (1956)
 Andalusia Express (1956) as Arturo
 El fenómeno (1956)
 La mestiza (1956) as Secretario
 Calle Mayor (1956) as Amigote #4 – Doctor
 Manolo guardia urbano (1956) as Conductor despistado
 Miracle of the White Suit (1956) as Ramón
 El maestro (1957) as Chauffeur
 Mensajeros de Paz (1957) as Ladrón en cárcel
 Ángeles sin cielo (1957) as Compinche de Curro
 Buongiorno primo amore! (1957) as Pepe
 Aquellos tiempos del cuplé (1958) as Cordero
 Heroes del Aire (1958) as Capitán
 El hincha (1958)
 El puente de la paz (1958)
 Red Cross Girls (1958) as Paciente de Andrés
 Marinai, donne e guai (1958) as complice di Aristotele 
 Parque de Madrid (1959)
 Noi siamo due evasi (1959)
 Venta de Vargas (1959) as Ventero
 Una gran señora (1959) as Don Manuel
 El día de los enamorados (1959) as Nica
 El gafe (1959)
 El secreto de papá (1959)
 At Five O'Clock in the Afternoon (1960) as Amigo (uncredited)
 Juicio final (1960)
 El amor que yo te di (1960)
 El Litri y su sombra (1960) as Aficionado (uncredited)
 El hombre que perdió el tren (1960)
 Crimen para recién casados (1960) as Oficial naval
 El traje de oro (1960)
 La quiniela (1960)
 Don Lucio y el hermano pío (1960) as El pecas
 El vagabundo y la estrella (1960) as Eufrasio
 Alma aragonesa (1961) as Tío Ramón
 Viridiana (1961) as Don Amalio
 El indulto (1961) as Empleado estación de Madrid
 Fantasmas en la casa (1961)
 Kilómetro 12 (1961)
 Historia de un hombre (1961)
 The Gang of Eight (1962) as Padre de Miguelín
 I tromboni di Fra Diavolo (1962)
 The Castilian (1963) as Fraile
 The Running Man (1963) as Porter
 Shéhérazade (1963)
 El globo azul (1963)
 El sol en el espejo (1963) as Sr. Pardo
 Duello nel Texas (1963) as Francisco (uncredited)
 The Swindlers (1963) as Brigadier (segment "Suore")
 Suspendido en sinvergüenza (1963)
 Júrame (1964)
 I maniaci (1964) (uncredited)
 Crucero de verano (1964) as Fodar
 Weeping for a Bandit (1964) as Cliente de la posada
 The Chosen Ones (1964) as Boquerón
 I marziani hanno 12 mani (1964) as Marito geloso
 A Fistful of Dollars (1964) as Silvanito
 Extraconiugale (1964) as Commendatore Sasselli (segment "Il mondo è dei ricchi")
 Oklahoma John (1965) as Rod Edwards
 La bugiarda (1965)
 Television Stories (1965) as Ramón Valladares
 El mundo sigue (1965) as Dueño Bar 
 Legacy of the Incas (1965) (uncredited)
 Captain from Toledo (1965) as Don Canio
 Desperate Mission (1965) as The Director of the company
 La Dama de Beirut (1965)
 La primera aventura (1965) as Cosme
 In a Colt's Shadow (1965) as Sheriff
 Perché uccidi ancora (1965) as López
 Una ráfaga de plomo (1965) as Yusuff 
 Weekend, Italian Style (1965) as Commendator Tagliaferri
 Platero y yo (1966) as Don José
 Due mafiosi contro Al Capone (1966) as Al Capone
 Monnaie de singe (1966) (uncredited)
 Nuevo en esta plaza (1966) as Tomás
 Web of Violence (1966)
 Che notte ragazzi! (1966) as Chófer
 For a Few Extra Dollars (1966) as Gordon
 Non faccio la guerra, faccio l'amore (1966) as Don Getulio
 El filo del miedo (1967) as Don César de Urdaz
 Day of Anger (1967) as Blind Bill
 Shoot Twice (1968) as Doctor Russell
 A Stranger in Paso Bravo (1968) as Vendedor de agua
 La notte è fatta per... rubare (1968) as Martin
 Rebus (1969) as Benson
 Cantando a la vida (1969)
 The Price of Power (1969) as Doctor Strips (uncredited)
 Golpe de mano (Explosión) (1970) as Padre de Novales
 Tristana (1970) as Campanero
 El Gran crucero (1970)
 The Underground (1970)
 Nights and Loves of Don Juan (1971) as Sultano Selim
 Dead Men Ride (1971) as Joselito Cosorito
 Murders in the Rue Morgue (1971) as Hunchback (uncredited)
 Los días de Cabirio (1971) as Padre de Mary Carmen
 Hector the Mighty (1972) as Lawyer
 Dust in the Sun (1972) as The Great Goldoni 
 Tragic Ceremony (1972) as Sam David
 La redada (1973) as Jefe superior de Policía 
 Carta de amor de un asesino (1973) as Ramón
 Little Funny Guy (1973) as Don Nicolone Salento
 Run, Run, Joe! (1974) as Don Salvatore
 Pim, pam, pum... ¡fuego! (1975) as Policía
 L'uomo che sfidò l'organizzazione (1975) as Zaccaria Rabajos
 Las bodas de Blanca (1975) as Cuñado de Antonio
 Esclava te doy (1976) as Juez
 Las delicias de los verdes años (1976) as D. Illán
 El secreto inconfesable de un chico bien (1976) as Don Gumersindo
 La espada negra (1976)
 Secretos de alcoba (1977) as Luis
 El último guateque (1977) as Don Julián
 El huerto del Francés (1978) as José Muñoz Lopera
 Mi mujer no es mi señora (1978) as Don Homero
 Soldados (1978)
 Tiempos de constitución (1979)
 En mil pedazos (1980) as Joaquín Faldrao
 ¡Qué verde era mi duque! (1980) as Palurdo
 Carta a nadie (1984) (final film role)

References

External links 

 

Spanish male film actors
Male Spaghetti Western actors
Male Western (genre) film actors
1916 births
1980 deaths
Male actors from Madrid
Spanish emigrants to the United States
20th-century Spanish male actors